Friedrich Wilhelm Bautz (20 December 1906, Brambauer, Lünen – 19 August 1979, Dortmund) was a Protestant theologian and writer.

Life 
Bautz studied theology in Münster, Bethel (Bielefeld), Berlin and Tübingen. From February 1939 he was pastor in the Franz Arndt-Haus, a war invalid home in Volmarstein, and later pastor in Kriescht and Annarode. From 1954 to 1958 he worked for the Neukirchener Verlagsgesellschaft as a publishing editor and at the same time as a parish representative at the parish of the Dorfkirche Stiepel. In 1959 he took over a sick leave in Heven (Witten). In the Stadt- und Landesbibliothek Dortmund (Dortmund City and State Library) as well as in the Universitäts- und Landesbibliothek Münster (University and State Library of Münster), Bautz worked on the Biographisch-Bibliographisches Kirchenlexikon (BBKL), a reference work whose founder he is considered to be.

With the piano teacher Else Bautz, née Schlimm, whom he married in 1939, he had three children, a daughter and two sons, of whom Traugott (1945–2020) continued the Biographisch-Bibliographisches Kirchenlexikon.

Selected works 

 Meine Seele ist stille zu Gott ("My soul is silent to God"). Witten 1936, .
 Er weiß dein Leid und heimlich Grämen. Trostbüchlein ("He knows your suffering and secret grievances. Consolation booklet"). Konstanz 1939, .
 Dein Weggenosse – Ein Kurzandachtsbuch für das Jahr 1949 ("Your Companion – A Short Devotional Book for the Year 1949"). Konstanz 1948, .
 Wir haben einen Gott, der da hilft. Feierstunde in der Gemeinde zum Jahresschluß ("We have a God to help. Celebration in the community at the end of the year"). Witten 1948, .
 Siegend schreitet Jesus über Land und Meer ("Jesus walks victoriously over land and sea") (= Glaubenshelden und Gottesstreiter ["Heroes of faith and warriors of God"]. Volume 1). Konstanz 1949, .
 Es kostet viel, ein Christ zu sein ("It costs a lot to be a Christian") (= Glaubenshelden und Gottesstreiter["Heroes of faith and warriors of God"]. Volume 2). Konstanz 1949, .
 Verheißungslicht und Erfüllungsfreude. Eine Weihnachtsfeierstunde in der Sonntagsschule. Was brachte uns die Weihnacht? Eine Weihnachtsfeierstunde in der Gemeinde. Gestaltung der Feier und Auswahl der Texte ("Promise and joy of fulfillment. A Christmas party in Sunday School. What did Christmas bring us? A Christmas party in the community. Design of the celebration and selection of texts) (= Evangeliums-Gedichte ["Gospel poems"]. Notebook 29/30). Witten 1948, .
 Die Neuapostolischen. Eine Darstellung ihrer Geschichte, Lehre und Verfassung und ihre Beurteilung im Lichte der Bibel ("The new apostolics. A presentation of their history, doctrine and constitution and their assessment in the light of the Bible") (= Kelle und Schwert ["Trowel and Sword"]. Notebook 81). Witten 1949, .
 Ein Christ kann ohne Kreuz nicht sein ("A Christian cannot be without a cross") (= Kreuzträger unter den Liederdichtern ["Cross bearer among the songwriters]". Volume 3). Baden-Baden 1952, .
 Von Gott will ich nicht lassen! ("I don't want to let go of God!") (= Kreuzträger unter den Liederdichtern ["Cross bearer among the songwriters]". Volume 2). Baden-Baden 1952, .
 Worte für die Stille ("Words for silence"). Witten 1952, .
 Festliche Stunden im Frühling. Ich singe mit, wenn alles singt. Eine Frühlingsfeier für die Sonntagsschule und den Jugendkreis. Gedicht für das Fest der Himmelfahrt. Vorlese- und Vortragsstoff für den Muttertag ("Festive hours in spring. I sing along when everything is singing. A spring celebration for Sunday School and the youth circle. Poem for the Feast of the Ascension. Reading and lecture material for Mother's Day") (= Evangeliums-Gedichte ["Gospel poems"]. Notebook 38/39). Witten 1953, .
 Irrlehren im Lichte der heiligen Schrift ("Heresies in the light of scripture"). Bielefeld 1954, .
 Die Christliche Wissenschaft ("The Christian Science") (= Kelle und Schwert ["Trowel and Sword"]. Notebook 83). Witten 1954, .
 Jesus ist kommen, Grund ewiger Freude. Eine Weihnachtsfeier in der Sonntagschule ("Jesus is coming, the reason for eternal joy. A Christmas party at Sunday School") (= Evangeliums-Gedichte ["Gospel poems"]. Notebook 33). Witten 1954, .
 Anthroposophie und Christengemeinschaft ("Anthroposophy and Christian Community") (= Kelle und Schwert ["Trowel and Sword"]. Notebook 88). Witten 1954, .
 Die Adventisten vom Siebenten Tage. Eine Darstellung ihrer Geschichte und Lehre und ihre Beurteilung im Lichte der Bibel ("The Seventh-Day Adventists. A presentation of their history and teaching and their assessment in the light of the Bible") (= Kelle und Schwert. Notebook 82). Witten 1955, .
 Erntedank. Feierstunde in der Gemeinde zum Erntedankfest ("Thanksgiving. Celebration in the congregation for Thanksgiving") (= Evangeliums-Gedichte ["Gospel poems"]. Notebook 32/32a). Witten 1954, .
 Verderbliche Irrlehren ("Perishable heresies") (= Kelle und Schwert ["Trowel and Sword"]. Notebook 15). Witten 1955, .
 Die Weihnachtsgeschichte in Wort und Lied. Eine Weihnachtsfeierstunde in der Sonntagsschule ("The Christmas story in words and songs. A Christmas celebration in Sunday school") (= Evangeliums-Gedichte ["Gospel poems"]. Notebook 48/49). Witten 1956, .
 Verderbliche Irrlehren. Worte der Aufklärung und Abwehr ("Perishable heresies. Words of enlightenment and defense") (= Kelle und Schwert ["Trowel and Sword"]. Notebook 15). Witten 1956, .
 Er füllt leere Hände. Tägliche Andachten ("He fills empty hands. Daily devotions"). Neukirchen-Vluyn 1965, .
 In Gottes Schule. Ein Buch der Hilfe und des Trostes ("In God's school. A book of help and comfort"). Stuttgart 1965, .
 In keinem andern ist das Heil. Eine Christusverkündigung aus alter und neuer Zeit ("In no other is salvation. A proclamation of Christ from old and new times"). Gladbeck 1966, .
 Das Wort vom Kreuz: Evangelische und katholische Theologen verkünden Christus, den Gekreuzigten ("The Word of the Cross: Protestant and Catholic theologians proclaim Christ the Crucified"). Einsiedeln/Zürich/Köln 1967, .
 La parola della croce: teologi evangelici e cattolici annunciano Cristo il crocifisso (= Spiritualità del nostro tempo). Assisi 1969, .
 Für dich – Für heute. Ein Wort der Heiligen Schrift als Geleit für den Tag ("For you – For today. A word of Sacred Scripture as an accompaniment for the day"). Regensburg 1974, ISBN 3772200834.
 Die Mormonen. Worte der Aufklärung und Abwehr ("The Mormons. Words of Enlightenment and Defense"). Gladbeck 1976, ISBN 3-7958-0028-5.
 Adventisten. Worte der Aufklärung und Abwehr ("Adventists. Words of Enlightenment and Defense"). Gladbeck 1976, ISBN 3795800870.
 Die Christengemeinschaft, einschließlich Anthroposophie. Worte der Aufklärung und Abwehr ("The Christian Community, including anthroposophy. Words of enlightenment and defense"). Gladbeck 1976, ISBN 3-7958-0018-8.
 Die „Christliche Wissenschaft“. Worte der Aufklärung und Abwehr ("The 'Christian Science'. Words of Enlightenment and Defense"). Gladbeck 1976, ISBN 3-7958-0008-0.
 Die Pfingstbewegung. Worte der Aufklärung und Abwehr ("The Pentecostal movement. Words of Enlightenment and Defense"). Gladbeck 1976, ISBN 3-7958-0038-2.
 Zeugen Jehovas. Worte der Aufklärung und Abwehr ("Jehovah's Witnesses. Words of Enlightenment and Defense"). Gladbeck 1976, ISBN 3795800978.

Bibliography

References

External links 
 Literature by and about Friedrich Wilhelm Bautz in the German National Library catalogue

1906 births
1979 deaths
German lexicographers
20th-century German Protestant theologians
20th-century lexicographers
20th-century Protestant religious leaders